The ATP Masters (known as ATP Masters 1000 tournaments since 2009) is an annual series of nine tennis tournaments featuring the top-ranked players on the ATP Tour since its inception in 1990. The ATP Masters tournaments along with the Grand Slam tournaments and the Year-end Championships make up the most coveted trophies on the annual ATP Tour calendar, in addition to the Olympics, hence they are collectively known as the 'Big Titles'.

Novak Djokovic holds the record for the most Masters singles titles with 38. By completing the set of all nine Masters singles titles in 2018, Djokovic became the first and only player to achieve the Career Golden Masters. In 2020, Djokovic completed a second Career Golden Masters.

In doubles, the Bryan brothers (Bob and Mike) have won a record 39 doubles titles as a team. Daniel Nestor and the Bryan brothers are the only doubles players who have achieved the Career Golden Masters.

History 
The Masters series was introduced in 1990 with the inception of the ATP Tour by bringing together the nine most prestigious tournaments of the preceding Grand Prix tennis circuit. Results in ATP Masters events earn players more ranking points than regular tournaments but less than Grand Slam events or the year-end ATP Finals. Up until 2007, most Masters finals were contested as best-of-five-set matches, but from 2008 all events were decided in best-of-three-set matches.

As part of a shake-up of the tennis circuit in 2009, the Masters Series became the ATP Tour Masters 1000, with the addition of the number 1000 referring to the number of ranking points earned by the winner of each tournament. Contrary to earlier plans, the number of tournaments was not reduced from nine to eight and the Monte-Carlo Masters remained part of the series although, unlike the other events, it does not have a mandatory player commitment. The Hamburg Masters event was downgraded to an ATP Tour 500 event. The Madrid Masters moved to May and onto clay courts. A new tournament in Shanghai replaced the Hamburg Masters and took over Madrid's former October indoor slot. In 2011, six of the nine Masters level tournaments were combined ATP and WTA events.

Series name 
1990–1995; ATP Championship Series, Single Week

1996–1999; ATP Super 9

2000–2003; Tennis Masters Series

2004–2008; ATP Masters Series

2009–2018; ATP World Tour Masters 1000

2019–present; ATP Tour Masters 1000

Ranking points 
ATP Points (as of 2009)

Tournaments 
Currently, the following nine tournaments are part of the ATP Masters 1000: Canadian Open (alternating yearly between Montreal and Toronto), Italian Open (held in Rome), Indian Wells Masters, Miami Open, Monte-Carlo Masters, Madrid Open, Cincinnati Masters, Shanghai Masters and Paris Masters. Since 2009, five of the tournaments have been held on outdoor hard courts, three on clay and one on indoor hard court, whereas from 1990 until 2008 there were two indoor tournaments at the top-9 level.

In 2009, the Shanghai Masters replaced the Madrid Open, which was until then held as an indoor event, in the eighth slot of the year with the Madrid Open switched to clay courts, replacing the Hamburg Open in the spring clay court season. The Shanghai Masters was designated as an outdoor event despite the facility having a retractable roof and having been used as the indoor venue for the ATP Finals from 2005 until 2008. Other than Hamburg, the tournaments defunct between 1990 to 2009 were Stockholm (1990–1994) and Stuttgart (1995–2001), which were held as indoor events in the eighth slot.

Results

2023 ATP Tour Masters 1000

2022 ATP Tour Masters 1000

2021 ATP Tour Masters 1000

2020 ATP Tour Masters 1000

2019 ATP Tour Masters 1000

2018 ATP World Tour Masters 1000

2017 ATP World Tour Masters 1000

2016 ATP World Tour Masters 1000

2015 ATP World Tour Masters 1000

2014 ATP World Tour Masters 1000

2013 ATP World Tour Masters 1000

2012 ATP World Tour Masters 1000

2011 ATP World Tour Masters 1000

2010 ATP World Tour Masters 1000

2009 ATP World Tour Masters 1000

2008 ATP Masters Series

2007 ATP Masters Series

2006 ATP Masters Series

2005 ATP Masters Series

2004 ATP Masters Series

2003 Tennis Masters Series

2002 Tennis Masters Series

2001 Tennis Masters Series

2000 Tennis Masters Series

1999 ATP Super 9

1998 ATP Super 9

1997 ATP Super 9

1996 ATP Super 9

1995 ATP Championship Series, Single Week

1994 ATP Championship Series, Single Week

1993 ATP Championship Series, Single Week

1992 ATP Championship Series, Single Week

1991 ATP Championship Series, Single Week

1990 ATP Championship Series, Single Week

Records 
 Active players in bold.

Title leaders

Career Golden Masters 
The achievement of winning all of the active nine ATP Masters tournaments over the course of a player's career.
 The event at which the Career Golden Masters was accomplished indicated in bold.

Singles

Doubles

Double crown 
 Winning the same Masters tournament in both singles and doubles in the same year.

Broadcasting rights 

Africa
  – Canal+ Afrique, SuperSport
  Middle East & North Africa – beIN Sports

America
  Latin America: ESPN
  – ESPN
  – TSN , Sportsnet
  – Tennis Channel
  – ESPN Deportes

Asia & Oceania
  – beIN Sports
  – Voot

Europe
  Continental Europe – Eurosport
  – Sky Deutschland
  – Sky Italia, SuperTennis
  – Canal+ Sport
  – Polsat Sport
  – Telecinco
  – Prime Video
Reference:

See also 

Overall statistics
 List of ATP Tour top-level tournament singles champions
 List of ATP Tour top-level tournament doubles champions
 Grand Prix Super Series

WTA Tour records
 WTA 1000 tournaments
 WTA 1000 Series singles records and statistics
 WTA 1000 Series doubles records and statistics
 List of WTA Tour top-level tournament singles champions
 List of WTA Tour top-level tournament doubles champions
 WTA Premier Mandatory and Premier 5
 WTA Tier I tournaments

References

External links 
 ATP Tour Official Site